James Krause (born 9 January 1987) is a former professional footballer

Krause, a defender, began his career with Ipswich Town and has represented England at under-17 level.

Krause signed a two-month loan deal with Carlisle United on 21 November 2006 with a view to a permanent deal. On 11 January 2007 his loan deal was extended to the end of the 2006–07 season, but returned to Ipswich on 3 May 2007 after playing only 3 first team League games.

Krause was released by Ipswich in May 2007 and subsequently joined Rushden & Diamonds, but was released in August 2007 and joined Crawley Town.

Honours
Ipswich Town
FA Youth Cup: 2004–05

References

External links

ITFC official player page

1987 births
Living people
Sportspeople from Bury St Edmunds
English footballers
Association football defenders
Ipswich Town F.C. players
Carlisle United F.C. players
Rushden & Diamonds F.C. players
Crawley Town F.C. players
Cambridge City F.C. players
English Football League players